No Small Affair is a 1984 American comedy-drama film directed by Jerry Schatzberg and starring Jon Cryer and Demi Moore.  Cryer, Jennifer Tilly, Tim Robbins and Tate Donovan make their film debuts.

Plot
The 16-year-old amateur photographer Charles (Jon Cryer) accidentally takes a photo of Laura (Demi Moore) while shooting the pier and falls in love with her when he develops the picture.

Enlarging the photo, Charles circulates the area, looking for her, even checks with local police with no luck. When his big brother Leonard and his fiancée come into town, they sneak him into a bar, where he sees her sing. Photographing her by the stage, the bouncer tries to drag him out and finally the cops do, but he finds out her name is Laura.

The lead guitarist of Laura's band quits, so she is about to lose her job. Although rejected at first by the 22-year-old, Charles offers to photograph her. That night, he convinces his brother and friends to move the stag night to her bar.

Even though Charles had increased the numbers that night, Laura's band was still cut, so she let him do a shoot. Afterwards, they dress up to sneak into a wedding reception. Caught by the father of the bride, Charles convinces him to let Laura literally sing for their supper.

Using the publicity photos he took, and all of his savings, Charles attempts to boost her performing career by starting an ad campaign without her knowing on the city's taxis — with unexpected results.

Added to the taxi ads was a short article that goes national, explaining the ad and their story. Laura has a huge gig, and a major record label picks her up. Before she moves to L.A., Charles stops by her place, spends the night and loses his virginity.

Cast
 Jon Cryer as Charles Cummings
 Demi Moore as Laura Victor
 George Wendt as Jake
 Peter Frechette as Leonard Cummings
 E.G. Daily as Susan
 Ann Wedgeworth as Joan Cummings
 Jeffrey Tambor as Ken
 Tim Robbins as Nelson
 Hamilton Camp as Gus Sosnowski
 Scott Getlin as Scott
 Judith Baldwin as Stephanie
 Jennifer Tilly as Mona
 Kene Holliday as Walt Cronin
 Thomas Adams as The Waiter
 Myles Berkowitz as John
 Tate Donovan as Bob 
 Arthur Taxier as The Bouncer

Production
No Small Affair originally went into production in 1981, under director Martin Ritt, and planned to star Matthew Broderick and Sally Field in the lead roles. Production was shut down two weeks in as Ritt suffered health problems. Mark Rydell was considered as a possible replacement for Ritt, but the production was scrapped. Producer William Sackheim remained committed to the project and screenwriters Michael Leeson and Terence Mulcahy were brought on to do rewrites (with Mulcahy getting credit on the screenplay with Craig Bolotin).

In 1984, the film was restarted with director Jerry Schatzberg and the lead roles were re-cast with Jon Cryer and Ellen Barkin. After a rehearsal, Barkin was replaced by Demi Moore.

Box office

No Small Affair grossed a little over $4.9 million against an $8.5 million budget, which made the film a box office failure.

Critical reception

No Small Affair received a mixed critical response. The film holds a 57% rating on Rotten Tomatoes based on seven reviews. The Christian Science Monitor's David Sterritt wrote "Jerry Schatzberg,...who worked with still pictures before moving to cinema, he cares more about capturing the visual charms of San Francisco than smoothly unfolding the happy-sad story. The result is friendly but bland".

References

External links 
 
 
 
 
 
 

1984 films
1984 comedy-drama films
1980s English-language films
Films set in San Francisco
Films shot in San Francisco
American comedy-drama films
Films directed by Jerry Schatzberg
Columbia Pictures films
Films about photographers
1980s American films